All Join In is the fourteenth studio and third children's (and most recent) album by American singer-songwriter Kenny Loggins. It was also his only album on Walt Disney Records, released on July 21, 2009. It was Loggins' first children's album since More Songs from Pooh Corner.

Loggins was asked to produce the album by the president of Walt Disney Records, David Agnew, who played Loggins' Pooh Corner records to his children. Loggins recalled, "He really got what I was trying to do, which was to make music that the parents would love as much as the children. So he called me and said 'I really want you to do it again, but this time I want it to be up-tempo.'" Loggins was nervous that the record would be "too kiddy", but said, "By picking really cool material that I loved, and doing it in a way that the production values were more adult, but still maintaining a light-hearted quality that the kids would love, it works."

As part of the marketing push for the album, Loggins performed live on the QVC shopping channel.

Track listing

References

External links

2009 albums
Kenny Loggins albums
Walt Disney Records albums
Children's music albums by American artists